Damien Joly (born 4 June 1992 in Ollioules) is a French swimmer. At the 2012 Summer Olympics, he competed in the men's 1500 metre freestyle, finishing in 14th place overall in the heats, failing to qualify for the final.

References

External links
 

1992 births
Living people
Olympic swimmers of France
Swimmers at the 2012 Summer Olympics
Swimmers at the 2016 Summer Olympics
French male freestyle swimmers
Sportspeople from Var (department)
People from Ollioules
European Aquatics Championships medalists in swimming
Medalists at the FINA World Swimming Championships (25 m)
21st-century French people